Joseph Paul Visner (born Joseph Paul Vezina: September 27, 1859 – June 17, 1945) was a 19th-century Major League Baseball outfielder and catcher born in Minneapolis, Minnesota. He played from 1885 to 1891, mostly in the American Association. Visner also has the distinction of being one of the few Native Americans to play professionally in the years prior to the arrival of the much more famous Louis Sockalexis. Visner had a brother named Lawrence Visner, and a sister-in-law by the name of Mary Visner.

Career

He didn't appear again until , when he played in 80 games, 53 at catcher for the first place Brooklyn Bridegrooms. The team lost the "World Series" after the season to the New York Giants, six games to three.

After a successful season in Brooklyn, Visner then jumped over to the Players' League and played all of his games as the starting right fielder for the Pittsburgh Burghers. He batted .267, and led the team in runs scored with 110, and hit 22 triples.

Post-career

After his major league career, he played some minor league baseball, specifically for the Minneapolis Millers of the Western League in 1894. Visner died in Fosston, Minnesota, at the age of 85, and was interred at the Hansville Cemetery, buried under his birth name of Vezina.

See also
 List of Major League Baseball annual triples leaders

References

External links

1859 births
1945 deaths
19th-century baseball players
Baseball players from Minneapolis
Major League Baseball catchers
Major League Baseball outfielders
Washington Statesmen players
Baltimore Orioles (AA) players
St. Louis Browns (AA) players
Brooklyn Bridegrooms players
Pittsburgh Burghers players
Rochester Flour Cities players
Kansas City Cowboys (minor league) players
Rochester Maroons players
Hamilton Hams players
Rochester Hop Bitters players
Albany Senators players
Omaha Omahogs players
Minneapolis Millers (baseball) players
Rockford Forest City players
Des Moines Prohibitionists players
Rockford Forest Citys players
Rockford Reds players
Burlington Hawkeyes players
Burials in Minnesota